Jerry Jerome (24 May 1874 – 27 September 1943) was born at Jimbour Homestead, near Dalby.  

Jerome's father was Wollon Charles, an Aboriginal labourer, and his mother's name was Guli. He was a descendent from the local Yiman people and in 1906 Jerome married Alice Davis.

Jerome lived during the Control of Aboriginal Protection Act, which meant that his movement and life were restricted to the control of the Chief Protector. Before his fourth fight with Fred Booth, Jerome was arrested in Warra, due to the Protection Act.  However, he was released in time for the Toowoomba fight where he was knocked out, which had the crowds convinced that he had been drugged. In 1908 a Dalby citizen applied successfully for Jerome's exemption on the spurious ground that he was a ‘half caste’, in order to be removed from the controlled native listing, which would allow him to pursue a sporting career.  

In 1908 Jerome, at the age of 34, officially commenced boxing at “The Pines”, a park near Warra, Queensland and was referred to in these early days as the "Warra Cyclone".  

In 1912 Jerome fought Black Paddy, champion of Western Australia, which was possibly the first contest between two Aboriginal professional boxers. Black Paddy was born in Murchison at Queensland and later moved to Cue, Western Australia.  In August 1912, in Brisbane to a crowd of five thousand spectators, Jerome defeated Black Paddy in a sixteen-round boxing match. In the same year Jerome was awarded the Australian middleweight boxing champion. 

Jerome was the first Indigenous Australian to win a major boxing title — defeating Charlie Godfrey to claim the Middleweight Championship of Australia at Brisbane on 7 September 1912. 

In 1915, Jerome fought nine times before retiring from a ring career.

Jerome had approximately 20 first-class fights that netted Jerome something in the vicinity of £5000.  Worth over $500,000 in today's money according to the Reserve Bank of Australia Pre-Decimal Inflation Calculator. 

In 1919 Jerome was a resident on Fraser Island where heartbreakingly he lost his daughter Myrtle.  The young girl was stricken with illness and taken to the Maryborough General Hospital where she died on 23 August 1919. 

As Jerome was an Australian Aboriginal, his earnings were placed in trust by government Protector of Aborigines, who were notoriously for not allowing Aborigines to access to this trust.  Today this is known as Stolen Wages.  

Jerome was moved to Barambah Aboriginal Settlement where he spent his last years coaching promising Aboriginal boxers and refereeing their bouts. 

Jerry Jerome ended life as he began it, in squalor, and stone motherless broke.  His last days were spent in segregation at Barambah (Cherbourg) Aboriginal Settlement, Murgon, Queensland.  It is said this comedian of the fight ring died with his famous bowler hat on.  Jerome was survived by his three sons and one of his two daughters.

In his professional career Jerome fought 58 boxing battles, 35 were wins and 23 were losses. In 1915 at the age of 41 Jerome resigned from boxing.

Jerome died on 27 September 1943 at Cherbourg Aboriginal mission penniless and is assumed to be buried at Murgon cemetery. At the time of his death Jerome was a white-haired, bushy-whiskered, toothless old man in his seventies.

Approximately 20 of Jerome's first-class fights netted him something in the vicinity of £5000. Worth over $500,000 in today's money according to the Reserve Bank of Australia Pre-Decimal Inflation Calculator. Reckless handling of his share of the purse resulted in the Chief Protector of Aborigines taking over control of his interests. His biggest purse was £575 for his fight with David Smith at Sydney Stadium under the direction of Snowy” Baker, worth over $71,000 today. Snowy Baker once said: “If old Jerome would ever keep as fit as he is capable of being made, he would be the greatest middle-weight fighter in the world”. With his money all gone he spent his last years coaching promising Aboriginal boxers and refereeing their bouts. Jerome was survived by his three sons and one of his two daughters.

Jerome was the 2008 Inductee for the Australian National Boxing Hall of Fame Old Timers category.

References

External links 
 ADB biography
 Jerry Jerome (Aboriginal boxer) 1874-1943 - State Library of Queensland

1874 births
1943 deaths
Indigenous Australian boxers
Australian male boxers
People from the Darling Downs
Middleweight boxers